Shomu Mukherjee (also spelt Shomu Mukherji; 19 June 1943 – 10 April 2008) was an Indian director, writer, and producer.

Filmography

References

External links

Film producers from Jharkhand
Bengali people
1943 births
2008 deaths
Hindi-language film directors
Indian male screenwriters
People from Jamshedpur
20th-century Indian film directors
Bengali screenwriters
20th-century Indian screenwriters
20th-century Indian male writers